Staats Mill Covered Bridge, also known as Tug Fork Covered Bridge, is a historic wooden covered bridge near Ripley in Jackson County, West Virginia, United States. Built in 1887, the Staats Mill Covered Bridge originally crossed the Tug Fork of Big Mill Creek and was named for Enoch Staats' water-powered mill.

The Staats family were early settlers to the area, arriving around 1780. The bridge was built adjacent to Enoch Staats' mill and store and played an important role in the history and development of Jackson County. Construction of the bridge was handled by the Jackson County Court, which paid a total of $1,788.35 to local craftspeople for completion of the structure.

The distinctive feature of Long trusses are the "X"-braced diagonals in each of the panels. The bridge is an impressive and historically significant example of a late nineteenth century timber-covered bridge building.

It was listed on the National Register of Historic Places in 1979.

In 1983, the old bridge was moved to the FFA-FHA State Camp at Cedar Lakes,  from the original site and reconstructed across a pond at a cost of $104,000. It is in excellent condition and open to pedestrian traffic only. Central to the project, was the expertise and knowledge of Dr. Emory Kemp of West Virginia University.

See also
List of bridges documented by the Historic American Engineering Record in West Virginia
List of West Virginia covered bridges

References

External links

Covered bridges on the National Register of Historic Places in West Virginia
Buildings and structures in Jackson County, West Virginia
Transportation in Jackson County, West Virginia
Tourist attractions in Jackson County, West Virginia
Wooden bridges in West Virginia
Pedestrian bridges in West Virginia
Former road bridges in the United States
National Register of Historic Places in Jackson County, West Virginia
Historic American Engineering Record in West Virginia
Rebuilt buildings and structures in West Virginia
Road bridges on the National Register of Historic Places in West Virginia